The Way to Paradise is a 1970 Croatian film directed by Mario Fanelli and written by Miroslav Krleža, starring Boris Buzančić and Ljuba Tadić. Krleža based the script on his own novellas The Cricket under a Waterfall and The Finale. It was the first film adaptation of his literary work, and the only one he was personally involved with.

Plot 

A man dies and goes to heaven, escaping the predicament of the modern civilisation. However, once there, he encounters similar people and situations.

Cast 
 Boris Buzančić as Professor Bernardo Leander
 Ljuba Tadić as the doctor
 Zvonko Strmac as chief physician
 Mato Grković as priest from the sarcophagus
 Snežana Nikšić as Miss Amalija
 Svjetlana Knežević as Marijana
 Zvonko Lepetić as Ensign Bandera
 Jovan Ličina as chief physician's patient
 Branko Supek as Cadet Rizling
 Relja Bašić as Kristian Pendrekovski
 Viktor Starčić as Baron Silvester
 Dragan Milivojević as first councillor to the embassy
 Antun Nalis as surgeon
 Vladimir Medar as chemist
 Branka Strmac as the lady with the black hat
 Ljiljana Gazdić as the woman who committed suicide from a window

Reception
The film was poorly received at the time of its release. Croatian cinema historian Ivo Škrabalo described it as a film where "Krležian rhetoric was not completed by suggestive development of the plot, so that one could hear only an outpouring of words on the screen, without connected connotations found in literature." The film did not enter competition at the 1971 Pula Film Festival.

Krleža disagreed with the critics of The Way to Paradise who had argued that extensive "meditative dialogue" dominated the film, maintaining his belief that "the human word in a film is equivalent to camera" and that without it, film is "merely commedia dell'arte and nothing else". Nevertheless, he was disappointed by the reception, and denied permissions for film adaptations of his works for the rest of his life.

References

External links
 

1970 films
Croatian drama films
1970s Croatian-language films
Yugoslav drama films
Jadran Film films
Films about the afterlife